Manuel "Manolo" Romero Paz (28 May 1950 – 23 November 2020) was a Spanish footballer who played as a midfielder, and a manager.

Playing career
Born in Madrid, Romero's first professional club was Getafe Deportivo, in Segunda División. He made his debut for the club on 5 September 1976, starting in a 2–3 away loss against CF Calvo Sotelo, and scored his first goal on 31 October, netting the last in a 1–1 draw at UE Sant Andreu.

In the 1978 summer Romero moved to UD Salamanca in La Liga. He made his debut in the main category only on 6 May of the following year, starting in a 1–3 home loss against Real Sociedad.

Romero joined Palencia CF in 1979, but made no appearances for the side.

Managerial career
Romero made his managerial debuts with Tomelloso CF in the 1993–94 campaign, in Segunda División B. He only returned to that category in 2002, after being appointed manager of AD Alcorcón.

After a spell at CD Cobeña, Romero joined Atlético Madrid's setup: after a year in charge of the Juvenil squad, he was named manager of the C-team in Tercera División, being later an interim manager and an assistant of the reserves.

Death
Romero died on 23 November 2020, aged 70.

References

External links

1950 births
2020 deaths
Footballers from Madrid
Spanish footballers
Association football midfielders
La Liga players
Segunda División players
Segunda División B players
Tercera División players
Getafe Deportivo players
UD Salamanca players
CD Badajoz players
CD Toledo players
Spanish football managers
AD Alcorcón managers
Atlético Madrid B managers
Palencia CF players